Wittey is a surname. Notable people with the surname include:

 David Wittey (born 1966), Australian rules footballer
 Neville Wittey (born 1957), Australian sailor

See also
 Whitty
 Withey
 Witty (disambiguation)